The 1983 Nobel Prize in Literature was awarded to the British author William Golding "for his novels which, with the perspicuity of realistic narrative art and the diversity and universality of myth, illuminate the human condition in the world of today".

Laureate

William Golding's works are regarded as parables of the human condition. His first novel The Lord of the Flies was published in 1954. Other notable works include The Inheritors (1955), Pincher Martin (1956), Free Fall (1959), The Spire (1964), Darkness Visible (1979) and Rites of Passage (1980).

Reactions
The choice of William Golding as the Nobel Prize laureate was seen as surprise by many observers. Golding was not among the favourites in the speculations for the prize, as Graham Greene and Anthony Burgess were regarded as the leading British contenders at the time. Other frequently mentioned candidates for the prize in 1983 were Nadine Gordimer (awarded in 1991), Joyce Carol Oates, Marguerite Yourcenar and the Chinese writer Ba Jin.

Unconventionally, a member of the awarding institution the Swedish Academy voiced his discontent with the choice of the laureate. Member Artur Lundkvist, who favoured the French writer Claude Simon (awarded in 1985), said that Golding "was decent but hardly in the Nobel Prize class", and publically accused the Academy's permanent secretary Lars Gyllensten for orchestrating a "coup" within the Academy to award William Golding.

Academy member Lars Forssell revealed that William Golding had been a candidate for three years and acknowledged that the choice would raise questions to why the Academy did not recognise the frequently favoured Graham Greene with the Nobel Prize. "Greene should have won it in the '50's", Forssell said, but it was widely known that both Artur Lundkvist and Lars Gyllensten was opposing the prize for Greene.

Swedish commentators included Arne Ruth, chief editor of the newspaper Dagens Nyheter, who concluded that the selection of Golding meant that Graham Greene would never win the prize, predicting that the Swedish Academy would move on to other nations literatures. "I don't think it's one of the really bad choices", Ruth said, "There have been worse. There is no consensus that he is a terrible writer". Ingemar Björksten, literary editor of Svenska Dagbladet, was surprised, saying that William Golding had "not entered the public discussion of possible or necessary Nobel Prize winners", but in choosing "a dark horse", Björksten said, the Academy appeared to want to single out a popular and readable storyteller, liking it to the choice of Isaac Bashevis Singer in 1978.

Award ceremony speech
In the award ceremony speech on 10 December 1983, Lars Gyllensten of the Swedish Academy said of William Golding's writing:

References

External links
Award ceremony speech
William Golding Nobel Lecture

1983